Liviu Giosan is a Romanian and American marine geologist studying the interactions between climate, landscapes and humans. In the public sphere, he initiated "Ad Astra", an association of scientists from Romania and Romanian diaspora, and has been actively involved in efforts to reform Romania's post-communist science and academia.

Career
Studying the sediment transfer system through rivers into and inside the ocean, he focuses especially on river deltas and has worked in the Danube, Indus, Ebro, Mackenzie among other regions. His work includes contributions reported on by National Geographic on the so-called "Noah's Flood" or the Black Sea deluge hypothesis, New York Times, on the collapse of the ancient urban Indus Valley civilisation and the long term impact of deforestation on the Danube Delta and the Black Sea, BBC on the drowning of river deltas under human-induced climate changes.

Giosan started his career studying the Danube delta. This work led to a classification of deltas highlighting the constructive role of waves and to the discovery of an asymmetric (polygenetic) end-member. These advances, together with novel ideas on river mouth morphodynamics, inspired approaches to numerically model river delta evolution and architecture. After producing the first accurate evolution model of the Danube Delta, Giosan explored the dramatic effects of early deforestation on the Danube and Black Sea as a type example of how humans have unintentionally affected the coastal ocean for millennia. Together with colleagues spanning disciplines from paleogenetics to engineering, he linked the rapid growth of the Danube delta in the last 2000 years to deforestation that started under the Roman Empire and accelerated during the Ottoman Empire's expansion in Europe. Paleo-DNA preserved in sediments indicated the ecosystem of the whole Black Sea has changed following the deforestation as Danube brought in more nutrients and silica from eroding soils. The magnitude of these changes for a continental-size system such as the Danube-Black Sea is a prime argument for an early Anthropocene epoch.

In 2003, after discovering of a large submarine extension of the Indus delta, Giosan and his colleagues started to explore the Holocene history of the Indus River and its ancient urban Indus Valley civilisation. Their analyses of landscape and human settlement dynamics along the Indus and its tributaries offered ample field-based support for a climatic theory of the Indus Civilization collapse. Landscape semi-fossilization as the Indian monsoon declined and aridity increased demonstrates that floods became erratic and less extensive making inundation agriculture less sustainable. Their studies also showed that the Ghaggar-Hakra, a former Indus tributary or a river flowing between the Indus and the Ganges watersheds and the most likely candidate for  Sarasvati River of mythical fame, retracted its reach toward the foothills of the Himalaya. That region continued to be populated by the Indus people long after the collapse of their cities. Further work by Giosan's team in peninsular India highlighted the regional character of the impact of such climate changes: while the Indus civilization collapsed under the monsoon decline, people of the peninsula expanded agriculture to cope with aridity. In interviews, Giosan compared the ancient Indus collapse to the present dependence on fossil fuels and introduced the term  "Goldilocks civilization" to underline their non-sustainable character.

In 2014, together with other leading deltaic researchers, he examined the global health of river deltas showing that these vast coastal lowlands cannot withstand the predicted rise in sea level for the next century and calling for maintenance and reconstruction measures. Using again Danube delta as an example, Giosan and his colleagues showed that the expansion of a shallow channel network used for fishing in the mid 20th century had beneficial effects by trapping sediments on the delta plain and counteracting sea level rise effects. This channelization of the delta plain, which mimics natural deltas in their youth, emerged as one of the methods for delta reconstruction.

Public life
In 2000 Giosan initiated and co-founded "Ad Astra", an association of academics dedicated to the reform of science and education in post-communist Romania. Occasionally he publishes analyses and OpEd texts in the Romanian media such as România Curată, Adevărul, or România Liberă.

References

University of Bucharest alumni
Stony Brook University alumni
Romanian geologists
Woods Hole Oceanographic Institution
Marine geologists
1968 births
Living people
People from Suceava County